Dragon Models Limited (Dragon or DML for short) is a Hong-Kong-based manufacturer of plastic model kits, diecast models and military action figures. Founded in 1987, the company shares distribution agreements with Stevens International in the United States, Revell/Monogram, Revell Germany and Italeri in Europe, and Hasegawa and GSI in Japan.

History
Dragon was established in 1987, as a sister company to model retailer Universal Models Limited (UML), to manufacture plastic model kits according to its own designs, so that UML would be less reliant on imported products. For the next decade Dragon focused only on models of military vehicles. It later began to share distribution agreement with model companies of other countries, so that their products could be exported worldwide. Since its founding it has released more than 1,000 items.

In 1997 Dragon diversified into other model fields. It started manufacturing a line of 1/400 airliner models called Dragon Wings, which is now one of Dragon's most important series. In 1999, Dragon introduced its styrene, 1:6 scale New Generation Life Action Figure series. The series currently encompasses more than 600 releases.

To capitalize on the success of Dragon Wings, Dragon introduced the Warbirds in 2002. A line of 1/72 scale diecast fighter aircraft, the series included both World War II and modern day planes. In 2003 Dragon began to manufacture 1/72 die-cast tank models to accompany Warbirds, marketed with the label "Dragon Armor".

As a military model maker, Dragon is distinguishable from other makers in that Dragon often has most number of parts, i.e. catering toward top end experienced modellers, rather than beginners.   However, Dragon is also trying to appeal to the more casual audience through its current release of 'Smart Kits' (see below).

Product Lines

Military Miniatures/Plastic Model Kits
The oldest category in Dragon's export line is the "Military Miniatures" series of scale figures and vehicles available in kit form. Many of these kits are marketed as "3 in 1", which means modellers can create one of three variations of the vehicle from the same kit. The series focuses on mostly World War II-era military subjects. A kit is usually packaged in a box with a painting of the vehicle alongside photos of the completed model. The number of parts of a kit is always printed on the box.

Dragon also produces 1/72 products. Rare or paper-only vehicles like the German E-100 and Maus are being manufactured in this scale. While smaller, these kits still feature photo-etched parts and decals common in 1/35 kits.

Beginning 2005, Dragon upgraded a number of its kits to include new features, as well as smaller parts for added details. Most of these kits also included decals printed by Cartograf, an Italian decal maker.

Magic Tracks and EZ tracks
'Magic Tracks' are individual track links that come in a bag, ready to be assembled without the tedious work of removing them from sprues. Magic Tracks are designed to snap together through a tight friction fit, so that the track can be more easily assembled than tracks molded with sprues. However, glue is still needed after the assembly.

Contrary to Dragon's claims of completely effortless assembly, cleaning the links up is still required, since each link has knock-out pin marks left behind from the molding process. Injection molding limitations also mean that tracks are not as detailed as traditional link tracks, for example missing the tiny holes in the guide horns of Tiger I.

One-Piece DS Tracks
A few of Dragon's newer kits, such as its Sherman M4A2 kit, include one-piece tracks made from 'Dragon Styrene 100' (DS), a plastic developed by Dragon's own Research and Development team. A cross breed of polystyrene and vinyl, DS is an attempt to combine the advantages of the two materials. Delicate details can be reproduced with DS using under-cut molding, reducing the number of small parts. The Tiger I hollow guide horns, for example, can be replicated on DS using slide-mold technology. These tracks can also be joined with normal plastic cement.

Some recent DS tracks seem to have an issue of being too long or too loose. The tracks may also come stretched due to packaging limitation, but the issue can be resolved by soaking the tracks in hot water.

Photo-etched Parts
Dragon almost always includes a small amount of photo-etched brass in its kits. Originally Dragon relied heavily on photo-etched parts to model engine deck screens, but it has since expanded its use of photo-etching to include optional parts like chains and fenders. Photo etched brass parts are used in kits to make small or delicate parts that are harder to make in scale from plastic, such as miniature eyeglasses, medals, seat belts, machine gun mounts, intake screens, etc.

In addition to photo-etched parts straight from the kit, Dragon also manufactures a small amount of separate photo-etched detail sets. It also has distribution agreement with Chinese model accessories company Lion Roar to sell and market Lion Roar's detail sets, which are available for kits from Dragon and other model companies.

Decals
Like its competitors, Dragon also includes decals in its kits. While Dragon sometimes prints its own decal sheets, it usually uses decals printed by Cartograf, an Italian decal maker.

Metal Parts
Turned aluminum barrels, metal tow cables, brass antenna and brass ammunition shells are common parts included in Dragon kits as an alternative to styrene parts. Small metal parts may also be included to accurately replicate a tank's wheels and lamp wiring. Some kits have as many as 48 metal parts.

Slide Molding
Although it is not a new technique, the use of slide molds allows more accurate reproduction of details than traditional two-piece molds. This is done by using injection molds with moving parts (known as "slides") that are inserted into the mold to form parts and then removed so the part can be extracted from the mold. It helps increase the authenticity of the model and reduce the number of parts by molding details onto larger parts. Weld patterns between plates, gratings, one-piece hull and turret interior are common features included in Dragon kits. The usage of slide mold technology has caused Dragon to rely less on photo-etched parts (See Smart Kit, below).

Smart Kits
According to Dragon, 'Smart Kits' are designed to be easier to build, without sacrificing the level of detail. Extra engineering has been invested in these kits, so that the construction of the models is more straightforward. Extensive use of slide molding techniques means crisply detailed parts are reproduced without the need of photo etched parts. Hence the kits can be built out of the box by most modelers using standard construction techniques. A 'Smart Kit' generally costs less than ordinary Dragon kits, because of the inclusion of fewer metal parts. However, Dragon emphasizes that the model has not in any way become simpler—only the assembly is less tedious.

Dragon has so far released thirty one Smart Kits, the first being a Panther G.

Dragon Wings (1/400 scale)
In 1997, Dragon started the Dragon Wings line of 1/400 scale aircraft, aiming not only at collectors but also airline companies who need display models. These models were sold fully finished. Over 100 commercial and national airline models have been released since then. Dragon was the officially appointed supplier of aircraft models for Airbus and Boeing for their promotional and souvenir purposes. In terms of commercial aviation, Dragon Wings was most active in the Early-Mid 2000s.

The 1/400 line of Dragon Wings also included a diecast space collection series. This collection includes models of the Space Shuttle, the Saturn V rocket of the Apollo program from NASA and many other launch vehicle such has the Delta II rocket. Other models like the International Space Station and the Russian space station Mir.  Dragon Wings went defunct in 2014, due to increasing competition.

Military Figures (1/6 scale)
In 1999, Dragon introduced its New Generation Life Action Figure series. The series features fully posable military and licensed 12-inch figures with cloth uniforms, weapons and equipment. The series currently stands at some 400-plus individual releases, with subjects varying from World War II, Modern Special Operations and Law Enforcement, to licensed character figures from movies, sports, electronic games and comics. The equipment ranged up to paratroopers with aircraft walls, functioning parachutes and many vehicles. During the early 2000s, Dragon Models produced hundreds of action figures, most of them being World War II German figures. However, after 2010, the number of figures that it produced began to sharply decline. Dragon Models stopped producing 1/6 scale action figures in November 2012.

Other action figure/model kit series:
Warrior Series (1/16) – Figures of tank crew and infantry
World's Elite Force Series (1/35)
'Nam' Series (1/35)
54mm Figures

Die-cast models (1/72 scale)
Dragon has released 'The Warbirds' line of mainly 1/72 scale die-cast fighter aircraft ranging from World War II classics to the modern day aircraft. In 2003 Dragon introduced another line of die-cast models – Dragon Armor – to complement with its Warbirds series of fighter aircraft. Dragon also markets a line of 1/144 models ('Panzer Korps') of German World War II and modern tanks.

Facilities
Dragon has several large regional divisions. The most notable is in Shanghai, China, which produces its own exclusive lines of products. Its headquarters is located in Tsuen Wan, Hong Kong.

Previously, the company maintained a subsidiary in  Industry, Southern California for marketing and distributing products for Dragon and other affiliated model companies in the US.  This operation has been discontinued.

John Adam hoax
In 2005 a militant group calling themselves the "Mujahedeen Brigades" posted a photograph depicting an American soldier named "John Adam" with his hands tied behind his back with a rifle pointed at him. His purported captors claimed that they would execute Adam if the United States did not comply with their demands, which called for the release of several Iraqi prisoners. Media sources questioned the photo's legitimacy and a military specialist for CNN commented that the image had several inaccuracies, one of which was the figure's uniform jacket. Soon after a spokesperson for Dragon noted that the man in the photo appeared to be the action figure "Special Ops Cody" and that the gun pointed at his head was an accessory that came with the toy. The toy had been manufactured exclusively for sale at AAFES in the Middle East. Sales of the figure rose after news of the toy's name spread.

See also
Model military vehicle
Plastic model

References

External links
New official page of DML and sisters companies.
Official page with links to DML's other divisions, with links to model reviews
Official page of Dragon Models USA servicing customers in the USA
Database of Dragon Wings model aircraft 1:400 Scale

Model manufacturers of Hong Kong
Hong Kong brands
Toy brands
Companies established in 1987
Toy companies of Hong Kong